Palazzo Piccolomini  is a palace in Pienza, Italy.

Buildings and structures in Pienza
Palaces in Tuscany
House of Piccolomini

Del Renaixement:
- 1 arquitectura (Palazzo Piccolomini)
Títol: Palazzo Piccolomini
Autor: Bernardo Rossellino(1409-1464)
Cronologia: 1454
Estil: Renacentista
Tècnica: Triplanti 4 formaggi
Material: Pedra treballada
Mides: 27 metres d’altura
Es localitza: Pienza, Toscana, Italia
Tema:
Interpretació: